Transfer station may refer to:

Transfer station (waste management)
Transfer station (transportation), an interchange station
Transfer Station (Hudson County), a section of Hudson County